Sasang–Hadan Line is a prospective light metro line in Busan, South Korea. The first phase will connect Sasang Station to Hadan Station. It is highly likely to open under the name "Line 5".

Infrastructure 
All stations will have elevators, escalators, and platform screen doors. The line will be equipped for unmanned automatic operation and will have a central control system for management of the entire line, eliminating the need for staff to be present at stations. Construction began in 2016 and is expected to be completed in 2023 with total operating expenses of 73.2 billion won.

Stations

See also 
 Busan Metro

References 

Busan Metro lines
Proposed rail infrastructure